Dooncastle is a townland in the Parish of Aughagower and Barony of Burrishoole in Ireland.

It is bordered to the west by the townland of Derrygorman in the Parish of Westport. To the north it is bordered by the townland of Sheean in the Parish of Islandeady. It is bordered by the following townlands in the Parish of Aughagower: to the southwest, Meneen; to the south, Knockroosky; to the east, Cushinkeel; and to the northeast, Doon.

In this townland are the remnants of Doon Castle, a former stronghold of the McPhilpin clan.

The railway line between Westport and Manulla Junction passes through the southern part of the townland, the N5 road through its northern part.

References 
 

Townlands of County Mayo